Greg Williamson (born August 13, 1978) is a Canadian drummer, session musician, and songwriter.  He is best known for his work with touring act Tupelo Honey, which is an original project started in 2003 in St. Albert, AB, Canada, where he resides.  They have played with numerous acts including Bon Jovi, Default, Theory of a Deadman, Bif Naked, Three Days Grace, Thornley, The Trews, Billy Talent, and Sam Roberts. Williamson has also performed with bands such as Econoline Crush, Mourning Wood, The Raygun Cowboys, and Cops + Robbers.  He does session work in Canada and abroad for other artists, such as Brian Melo on his record "Livin' It". He plays many musical styles.

References

Living people
Canadian male drummers
1978 births
Canadian session musicians
Musicians from Regina, Saskatchewan
21st-century Canadian drummers
21st-century Canadian male musicians